Yeshivas Toras Chessed is a Jewish yeshiva, or rabbinical school.
Its curriculum focuses on Torah study, emphasizing the study of Talmud and Jewish law.  It is based in Wellbury House, Great Offley, near Hitchin in Hertfordshire. Previously Wellbury House had been a private school for Catholic boys aged 7 to 13.

Founded in about 1989, the yeshiva follows the Ashkenazi Orthodox ritual and is affiliated to the Union of Orthodox Hebrew Congregations. The yeshiva has about 200 students on a  site.

Leadership
When the Rosh Yeshiva (head) Rabbi A. SH. Stern became ill, the yeshiva relocated to London. 
A new Yeshiva named Or Torah was opened in Hitchin by his brother Y. M. Stern, who then claimed to be a partner also in the leadership of Toras Chessed.

When Rabbi A. SH. Stern died, there was a Din Torah re the leadership of the Toras Chessed yeshiva, between current Rosh Yeshiva, Chaim Babad and the children of A. SH. Stern: leadership was granted to Chaim Babad. 

There was a concurrent Din Torah re control of the land in Hitchin; this between Chaim Babad, Y. M. Stern and the children of A. SH. Stern.
Y. M. Stern claimed that he and B. Weisman were partners with Rabbi A. SH. Stern; therefore following the latter's relocation to London, Y.M. Stern and Weismann remained the only trustees on Toras Chesed and its properties.
The Din Torah did not accept Y. M. Stern's version and declared that A. SH. Stern had been the only trustee; a compromise was then reached re shares in the land itself.

References

External links
The Yeshivas Toras Chessed on the Jewish Communities and Records website
The Hitchin Yeshiva on the BBC News website 2002
The Hitchin Yeshiva on the United Kingdom Government News website 2002

Haredi Judaism in the United Kingdom
Orthodox Judaism in England
Orthodox yeshivas in the United Kingdom
Educational institutions established in the 1980s
Education in Hertfordshire